= Continental Creek =

Stream in Idaho

Coordinates: 48°58′50″N 116°55′54″W

Continental Creek is a stream in the U.S. state of Idaho.

Continental Creek takes its name from nearby Continental Mountain.

No animals have been reported near continental creek area so far. Top three bird species are Red Crossbill, Swainson's Thrush and Chipping Sparrow.
